Khvoshinan or Khowshinan or Khushinan or Khvoshi Nan, also rendered as Khoshnian, may refer to:
 Khvoshinan-e Olya, Kermanshah Province
 Khvoshinan-e Sofla, Kermanshah Province
 Khvoshinan-e Vosta, Kermanshah Province
 Khushinan, a village in Kurdistan Province, Iran